The Showcase Showdown was an American band that was a fixture in Boston's punk rock scene in the 1990s. The band toured the Northeast extensively and became notorious for their tongue-in-cheek songs, often about obscure cultural icons from political history, television shows and comic books. Its name was among these references, referring to the "Showcase Showdown," a game play element on the game show The Price Is Right.

Background
Showcase Showdown released only two full-length albums, Appetite of Kings and Permanent Stains.  They released much of their work on 7" vinyl singles and cassettes, and were featured on several split EPs including a split with Blanks 77 entitled "Drunk at the Karaoke Bar" featuring duets by mostly inebriated members of both bands.

The lineup of the group consisted of Albert "Ping Pong" Genna on vocals, Victoria Arthur on bass, Tom Cloherty on guitar, and Steve "Chez Nips" Maxwell on drums. Arthur was a medical student at the University of Massachusetts Medical School through much of the band's career, and her husband, Cloherty, was working as a social worker. After Showcase Showdown's breakup, Arthur and Cloherty formed the group The Spitzz.

Reception
Allmusic's review of the album Appetite of Kings noted the influence of the Sex Pistols, along with "aggressive pogo-punk". Critic Sarah Bee of Melody Maker, in a favorable review of the album Permanent Stains, wrote, "These men are in touch with their inner deviants."

Critic Ian D'Giff of Newsday wrote that Showcase Showdown's cover version of the Sex Pistols' song "Friggin' in the Riggin'", from the album Never Mind the Sex Pistols... Here's the Tribute, was "raging", and it "nearly makes up for the album's shortcomings".

Discography

Albums
Appetite of Kings (1996) Elevator Music
Permanent Stains (1999) Damaged Goods Records

Cassettes
Self-titled Tape (1993) Tario Records
6 Foot Sofa (1993) Tario Records
All The Presidents' Heads & Chickens Tape (1994) Tario Records

Vinyl
Showcase Showdown 7" (1993) Tario Records
Chickens 7" (1994) Tario Records
All The Presidents' Heads 7" (1994) Pogostick Records
Christmas 7" (1995) Tario Records
Soothing Moments 7" (1996) Beer City Records
Split w/ Twerps 8" (1997) 702 Records
Assemble Your Own Dictator (split w/ August Spies) 7" (1997) Tario Records
Drunk at the Karaoke Bar (w/ Blanks 77) 7"(1997) Tario Records
We Are Showcase Showdown 7" Picture Disc (1998) Tario Records

Compilation exclusive tracks
"Drano" Runt of the Litter CD (1996) Fan Attic Records
"Forgery" Suburban Voice No. 38 7" (1996) Suburban Voice
"The Devil Speaks French/Here Come the Televampires" I've Got My Friends CD (1996) Flat Records
"Johnny Wont Go To Heaven" Joey Vindictive Presents: That Was Now, This is Then CD (1997) VML Records
"The Only Thing Scary About Halloween Is Your Fucking Face" Songs for the Witching Season 7" (1998) Creep Records
"Get Out" Scene Killer Vol.2 CD (1999) Outsider Records
"Friggin' in the Riggin'" Never Mind the Sex Pistols, Here's the Tribute CD (2000) Radical Records

References

Musical groups from Boston
Punk rock groups from Massachusetts
Oi! groups